Angèle Van Laeken (born 3 December 1995) is a Belgian singer. She was one of 2018's biggest breakout acts in French and Belgian pop music, breaking Stromae's record for weeks at the top of the Belgian singles charts with her 2018 single "Tout oublier" which features her brother, Roméo Elvis.

Early life
Angèle van Laeken was born on 3 December 1995, in Uccle, Brussels-Capital Region. Angèle is the daughter of the singer Marka and of the actress Laurence Bibot. Her brother is the rapper Roméo Elvis.

Her father encouraged her from an early age to learn the piano, which inspired her musical career.

Angèle spent a difficult adolescence in a strict Catholic school before attending the Decroly School. The artistic options at this high school helped develop her musical skills. She then enrolled in the Jazz Studio Antwerp for a jazz education before joining her father's band.

Career

2018–present: Career beginnings and Brol

Angèle gave her first performances in cafés around Brussels. Notably at the restaurant Le Delecta, in Ixelles, now closed.

She was first noticed for her cover of Dick Annegarn, "Bruxelles", and on Instagram videos where she mixed singing and comedy. In 2017, she was the support act for Ibeyi and the Belgian rapper Damso, whom she also accompanied in his album Lithopédion.

Her first single, "La Loi de Murphy", was released in late 2017 and received millions of views on YouTube. A second single "Je veux tes yeux" was released in early 2018. The two video clips were directed by the Belgian photographer Charlotte Abramow.

In May 2018, she performed her first Parisian concert at the Trianon accompanied by MC Solaar on her cover of his song "Victime de la mode". She performed in several summer festivals in Belgium, France and Switzerland such as Les Ardentes, Dour, Garorock, and Rock Werchter. In 2018, Angèle released her third single, "La Thune".

In August 2018, she announced the tracklist of her first album Brol on the Initial label. The album was released on 5 October 2018, the same day as her single duet with her brother, Roméo Elvis. This album was successful and resulted in Angèle invitation to perform on various French TV shows. The single, "Tout oublier", spent nine weeks at number 1 on the Ultratop charts, breaking the record for a Belgian artist formerly set by Stromae.

In 2019, Angèle became one of the most sought for artists in France and Belgium and affirmed her feminism with the song "Balance ton quoi" in reference to the French #metoo movement, Balance ton porc. Pierre Niney makes an appearance in the video alongside some of Angèle's friends to talk about struggles her female friends have encountered with men. Angèle became an ambassador for Chanel afterwards.

In April 2020, Angèle performed for One World: Together At Home, a global broadcast and digital special to support front-line healthcare workers and the WHO during the COVID-19 pandemic, hosted by Lady Gaga.

In October 2020, Angèle was pictured alongside London singer Dua Lipa on the set of a music video. A collaboration with the latter was later announced and would feature on the reissue of Lipa's new album Future Nostalgia. "Fever" was released on 30 October 2020. The music video was released a week later on 6 November 2020 on YouTube. Before the release of the video, Lipa announced on social media that Angèle will be appearing as a special guest on her live stream concert Studio 2054 on 27 November 2020.

In 2021 Angèle made her film debut in Annette, directed by Leos Carax.

In 2022, Angèle featured in "Sunflower" from Tamino Amir's sophomore album, Sahar.

Musical influences 
Angèle is a fan of Ella Fitzgerald and Hélène Ségara. She is inspired by many musical genres from French songs to electronic music and rap, which she disliked as a teenager. She became influenced by rap, particularly while performing with her brother Romeo Elvis and the rappers Caballero and JeanJass.

Personal life
From 2017 to 2019, she dated French dancer and choreographer Léo Walk. She wrote the song "Perdus" which is about the end of their relationship, linked to her new notoriety.

In August 2020, Angèle announced on Instagram that she was dating French comedian Marie Papillon, while coming out. They separated the following year. Photos of them where previously published by French tabloid Public in 2019, then discussed in the talk show Touche pas à mon poste !, without Angèle’s consent and outing her. In her 2021 self-titled Netflix documentary, Angèle confirmed her bisexuality.

Tours

Headlining

 Brol Tour (2018–2020)
 Nonante-Cinq Tour (2022–2023)

Opening act

 Damso – Ipséité Tour (2017)
 Dua Lipa – Future Nostalgia Tour (2022)

Discography

Studio albums

Singles

As lead artist 

Notes

As featured artist

Other charted songs

Filmography

Film

Television

Awards and nominations

Red Bull Elektropedia Awards

D6bels Music Awards
The D6bels Music Awards is a musical event organized by RTBF, a public radio and television service of the French Community of Belgium.

MTV Europe Music Awards

Music Industry Awards
The MIA's, in full Music Industry Awards, are Flemish music prizes that are awarded by the VRT in collaboration with Music Centre Flanders.

Victoires de la Musique
Victoires de la Musique is an annual French award ceremony where the Victoire accolade is delivered by the French Ministry of Culture to recognize outstanding achievement in the music industry that recognizes the best musical artists of the year. The awards are the French equivalent to the Grammy Awards and the Brit Awards for music, and it is one of the major awards in France.

NRJ Music Awards

UK Music Video Awards

References

External links 
 
 

Living people
1995 births
21st-century Belgian women singers
21st-century Belgian singers
People from Uccle
Belgian women singer-songwriters
Belgian pianists
Belgian women pop singers
French-language singers of Belgium
Feminist musicians
Belgian LGBT singers
Belgian LGBT songwriters
Bisexual songwriters
Belgian bisexual people
Belgian LGBT rights activists
MTV Europe Music Award winners
Universal Music Group artists
21st-century Belgian LGBT people
Bisexual singers
Bisexual women
21st-century women pianists